Plandome Pond Park (also known as Plandome Park and historically as Bourndale Park) is a park in the Incorporated Village of Plandome Heights, in Nassau County, on Long Island, in New York, United States. It is located within and operated by the Town of North Hempstead.

Description 
Plandome Pond Park features walking paths and sitting areas. A pond is also located within the park.

The park was created in the late 1950s, following the purchase of land in what is now the park for a water recharge basin. Originally, what is now the location of the park, which is part of the area known as Chester Hill, was to be developed with homes. This changed when Nassau purchased the land for the recharge basin. Residents of the Chester Hill section were concerned about the recharge basin, and were successful in having Nassau County create the park, which covered the piping needed for their recharge basin on the property.

The park received upgrades in the 2010s. These upgrades included the dredging of the pond to make it deeper.

See also 

 Manhasset Valley Park – Another park in Manhasset operated by the Town of North Hempstead.

References 

Manhasset, New York
Town of North Hempstead, New York
Parks in Nassau County, New York